Oman Oil and Gas Exhibition Centre is a museum, located on Seih Al Maleh Street, Al-Qurum, Muscat, Oman.

The museum was established 1995 as a donation from Petroleum Development Oman (PDO). The museum is an interactive journey exploring the discovery, extraction and use of fossil fuels in Oman.

Adjacent to the centre is the PDO Planetarium, built in 2000.

References

See also
 List of museums in Oman
 List of petroleum museums

1995 establishments in Oman
Museums established in 1995
Museums in Muscat, Oman
Petroleum museums
Gas museums